Sacagawea (  or  ; also spelled Sakakawea or Sacajawea; May  – December 20, 1812 or April 9, 1884) was a Lemhi Shoshone woman who, in her teens, helped the Lewis and Clark Expedition in achieving their chartered mission objectives by exploring the Louisiana Territory. Sacagawea traveled with the expedition thousands of miles from North Dakota to the Pacific Ocean, helping to establish cultural contacts with Native American people and contributing to the expedition's knowledge of natural history in different regions.

The National American Woman Suffrage Association of the early 20th century adopted her as a symbol of women's worth and independence, erecting several statues and plaques in her memory, and doing much to recount her accomplishments.

Early life 
Reliable historical information about Sacagawea is very limited. She was born  into the Agaidika ('Salmon Eater', aka Lemhi Shoshone) tribe near present-day Salmon, Lemhi County, Idaho. This is near the continental divide at the present-day Idaho-Montana border.

In 1800, when she was about 12 years old, Sacagawea and several other children were taken captive by a group of Hidatsa in a raid that resulted in the deaths of several Shoshone: four men, four women, and several boys. She was held captive at a Hidatsa village near present-day Washburn, North Dakota.

At about age 13, she was sold into a non-consensual marriage to Toussaint Charbonneau, a Quebecois trapper. He had also bought another young Shoshone girl, known as Otter Woman, for a wife. Charbonneau was variously reported to have purchased both girls from the Hidatsa, or to have won Sacagawea while gambling.

Lewis and Clark Expedition 
In 1804, the Corps of Discovery reached a Mandan village, where Captains Meriwether Lewis and William Clark built Fort Mandan for wintering over in 1804–05. They interviewed several trappers who might be able to interpret or guide the expedition up the Missouri River in the springtime. Knowing they would need to communicate with the tribal nations who lived at the headwaters of the Missouri, they agreed to hire Toussaint Charbonneau, who claimed to speak several Native languages, and one of his wives, who spoke Shoshone.  Sacajawea was pregnant with her first child at the time.

On November 4, 1804, Clark recorded in his journal:

Charbonneau and Sacagawea moved into the expedition's fort a week later. Clark later nicknamed her "Janey." Lewis recorded the birth of Jean Baptiste Charbonneau on February 11, 1805, noting that another of the party's interpreters administered crushed rattlesnake rattles in water to speed the delivery. Clark and other members of the Corps nicknamed the boy "Pomp" or "Pompy."

In April, the expedition left Fort Mandan and headed up the Missouri River in pirogues. They had to be poled against the current and sometimes pulled by crew along the riverbanks. On May 14, 1805, Sacagawea rescued items that had fallen out of a capsized boat, including the journals and records of Lewis and Clark. The corps commanders, who praised her quick action, named the Sacagawea River in her honor on May 20, 1805. By August 1805, the corps had located a Shoshone tribe and was attempting to trade for horses to cross the Rocky Mountains. They used Sacagawea to interpret and discovered that the tribe's leader, Cameahwait, was her brother.

Lewis recorded their reunion in his journal:

And Clark in his:

The Shoshone agreed to barter horses to the group and to provide guides to lead them over the rugged Rocky Mountains. The trip was so hard that they ran short of food. When they descended into the more temperate regions on the other side, Sacagawea helped to find and cook camas roots to help the party members regain their strength.

As the expedition approached the mouth of the Columbia River on the Pacific Coast, Sacagawea gave up her beaded belt to enable the captains to trade for a fur robe they wished to bring back to give to President Thomas Jefferson.

Clark's journal entry for November 20, 1805, reads:

When the corps reached the Pacific Ocean, all members of the expedition—including Sacagawea and Clark's black manservant York—voted on November 24 on the location for building their winter fort. In January, when a whale's carcass washed up onto the beach south of Fort Clatsop, Sacagawea insisted on her right to go see this "monstrous fish."

On the return trip, they approached the Rocky Mountains in July 1806. On July 6, Clark recorded:The Indian woman informed me that she had been in this plain frequently and knew it well.… She said we would discover a gap in the mountains in our direction [i.e., present-day Gibbons Pass]. A week later, on July 13, Sacagawea advised Clark to cross into the Yellowstone River basin at what is now known as Bozeman Pass. Later, this was chosen as the optimal route for the Northern Pacific Railway to cross the continental divide.

While Sacagawea has been depicted as a guide for the expedition, she is recorded as providing direction in only a few instances, primarily in present-day Montana.  Her work as an interpreter helped the party to negotiate with the Shoshone. But, she also had significant value to the mission simply by her presence on the journey, as having a woman and infant accompany them demonstrated the peaceful intent of the expedition. While traveling through what is now Franklin County, Washington, in October 1805, Clark noted that "the wife of Shabono [Charbonneau] our interpreter, we find reconciles all the Indians, as to our friendly intentions a woman with a party of men is a token of peace." Further he wrote that she "confirmed those people of our friendly intentions, as no woman ever accompanies a war party of Indians in this quarter".

As Clark traveled downriver from Fort Mandan at the end of the journey, on board the pirogue near the Ricara Village, he wrote to Charbonneau:

Later life and death

Children
Following the expedition, Charbonneau and Sacagawea spent 3 years among the Hidatsa before accepting William Clark's invitation to settle in St. Louis, Missouri, in 1809. They entrusted Jean-Baptiste's education to Clark, who enrolled the young man in the Saint Louis Academy boarding school. Sacagawea gave birth to a daughter, Lizette Charbonneau, about 1812. Lizette was identified as a year-old girl in adoption papers in 1813 recognizing  William Clark, who also adopted her older brother that year. Because Clark's papers make no later mention of Lizette, it is believed that she died in childhood.

Death 
According to Bonnie "Spirit Wind-Walker" Butterfield (2010), historical documents suggest that Sacagawea died in 1812 of an unknown sickness. For instance, a journal entry from 1811 by Henry Brackenridge, a fur trader at Fort Lisa Trading Post on the Missouri River, wrote that Sacagawea and Charbonneau were living at the fort. Brackenridge recorded that Sacagawea "had become sickly and longed to revisit her native country." Butterfield notes that in 1812, a Fort-Lisa clerk, John Luttig, recorded in his journal on December 20 that "the wife of Charbonneau, a Snake Squaw [i.e. Shoshone], died of putrid fever." He said that she was "aged about 25 years. She left a fine infant girl." Documents held by Clark show that Charbonneau had already entrusted their son Baptiste to Clark's care for a boarding school education, at Clark's insistence (Jackson, 1962).

In February 1813, a few months after Luttig's journal entry, 15 men were killed in a Native attack on Fort Lisa, which was then located at the mouth of the Bighorn River. Luttig and Sacagawea's young daughter were among the survivors. Charbonneau was mistakenly thought to have been killed at this time, but he apparently lived to at least age 76. He had signed over formal custody of his son to William Clark in 1813.

As further proof that Sacagawea died in 1812, Butterfield writes:
An adoption document made in the Orphans Court Records in St. Louis, Missouri, states, 'On August 11, 1813, William Clark became the guardian of Tousant Charbonneau, a boy about ten years, and Lizette Charbonneau, a girl about one year old.' For a Missouri State Court at the time, to designate a child as orphaned and to allow an adoption, both parents had to be confirmed dead in court papers.

The last recorded document referring to Sacagawea's life appears in William Clark's original notes written between 1825 and 1826. He lists the names of each of the expedition members and their last known whereabouts. For Sacagawea, he writes, "Se car ja we au— Dead."

Some oral traditions relate that, rather than dying in 1812, Sacagawea left her husband Charbonneau, crossed the Great Plains, and married into a Comanche tribe. She was said to have returned to the Shoshone in 1860 in Wyoming, where she died in 1884. However there is no independent evidence supporting this tale.

Jean Baptiste Charbonneau 
	 
Sacagawea's son, Jean Baptiste Charbonneau, had an adventurous life. Known as the infant who, with his mother, accompanied the explorers to the Pacific Ocean and back, he had lifelong celebrity status. At the age of 18, he was befriended by a German Prince, Duke Paul Wilhelm of Württemberg, who took him to Europe. There, Jean Baptiste lived for six years among royalty, while learning four languages and allegedly fathering a child in Germany named Anton Fries.
	  	
After his infant son died, Jean Baptiste returned from Europe in 1829 to the United States. He lived after that as a Western frontiersman. In 1846, he led a group of Mormons to California for the gold rush. While in California, he was appointed as a magistrate for the Mission San Luis Rey. He disliked the way Indians were treated in the missions and left to become a hotel clerk in Auburn, California, once the center of gold rush activity.
	  	
After working six years in Auburn, Jean Baptiste left in search of riches in the gold mines of Montana. He was 61 years old, and the trip was too much for him. He became ill with pneumonia and died in a remote area near Danner, Oregon, on May 16, 1866.

Burial place
The question of Sacagawea's burial place caught the attention of national suffragists seeking voting rights for women, according to author Raymond Wilson. Wilson argues that Sacagawea became a role model whom suffragists pointed to "with pride". She received even more attention in the 1930s, after publication of a history novel about her.

Wilson notes:
Interest in Sacajawea peaked and controversy intensified when Dr. Grace Raymond Hebard, professor of political economy at the University of Wyoming in Laramie and an active supporter of the Nineteenth Amendment, campaigned for federal legislation to erect an edifice honoring Sacajawea's alleged death in 1884.

An account of the expedition published in May 1919 noted that "A sculptor, Mr. Bruno Zimm, seeking a model for a statue of Sacagawea that was later erected at the Louisiana Purchase Exposition in St. Louis, discovered a record of the pilot-woman's death in 1884 (when ninety-five years old) on the Shoshone Reservation, Wyoming, and her wind-swept grave."

In 1925, Dr. Charles Eastman, a Dakota Sioux physician, was hired by the Bureau of Indian Affairs to locate Sacagawea's remains. Eastman visited various Native American tribes to interview elders who might have known or heard of Sacagawea. He learned of a Shoshone woman at the Wind River Reservation with the Comanche name Porivo ('chief woman'). Some of those he interviewed said that she spoke of a long journey wherein she had helped white men, and that she had a silver Jefferson peace medal of the type carried by the Lewis and Clark Expedition. He found a Comanche woman named Tacutine who said that Porivo was her grandmother. According to Tacutine, Porivo had married into a Comanche tribe and had a number of children, including Tacutine's father, Ticannaf. Porivo left the tribe after her husband, Jerk-Meat, was killed.

According to these narratives, Porivo lived for some time at Fort Bridger in Wyoming with her sons Bazil and Baptiste, who each knew several languages, including English and French. Eventually, she returned to the Lemhi Shoshone at the Wind River Reservation, where she was recorded as "Bazil's mother." This woman, Porivo, is believed to have died on April 9, 1884.

Eastman concluded that Porivo was Sacagawea. In 1963, a monument to "Sacajawea of the Shoshonis" was erected at Fort Washakie on the Wind River reservation near Lander, Wyoming, on the basis of this claim.

The belief that Sacagawea lived to old age and died in Wyoming was widely disseminated in the United States through Sacajawea (1933), a biography written by historian Grace Raymond Hebard, a University of Wyoming professor, based on her 30 years of research.

Mickelson recounts the findings of Thomas H. Johnson, who argues in his Also Called Sacajawea: Chief Woman's Stolen Identity (2007) that Hebard identified the wrong woman when she relied upon oral history that an old woman who died and is buried on the Wyoming Wind River Reservation was Sacajawea. Critics have also questioned Hebard's work because she portrayed Sacajawea in a manner described as "undeniably long on romance and short on hard evidence, suffering from a sentimentalization of Indian culture."

Name 
A long-running controversy has related to the correct spelling, pronunciation, and etymology of the Shoshone woman's name. Linguists working on Hidatsa since the 1870s have always considered the name's Hidatsa etymology essentially indisputable. The name is a compound of two common Hidatsa nouns: cagáàga ('bird') and míà ('woman'). The compound is written as Cagáàgawia ('Bird Woman') in modern Hidatsa orthography, and pronounced  ( is pronounced  between vowels in Hidatsa). The double  in the name indicates a long vowel, while the diacritics suggest a falling pitch pattern.

However, most English speakers perceive the accented syllable (the long ) as stressed. In faithful rendering of Cagáàgawia to other languages, it is advisable to emphasize the second, long syllable, rather than the last, as is common in English.

The name has several spelling traditions in English. The origin of each tradition is described in the following sections.

Sacajawea 
The spelling Sacajawea is said to have derived from Shoshone Saca-tzaw-meah, meaning 'boat puller' or 'boat launcher'. In contrast to the Hidatsa etymology more popular among academics, Sacajawea is the preferred spelling used by her own tribe, the Lemhi Shoshone people, some of whom claim that her Hidatsa captors transliterated her Shoshone name in their own language and pronounced it according to their own dialect. That is, they heard a name that approximated tsakaka and wia, and interpreted it as 'bird woman', substituting their hard "g/k" pronunciation for the softer "tz/j" sound that did not exist in the Hidatsa language.

The use of this spelling almost certainly originated with Nicholas Biddle, who used the "j"  when he annotated the journals of the Lewis and Clark Expedition for publication in 1814. This use became more widespread with the publication in 1902 of Eva Emery Dye's novel The Conquest: The True Story of Lewis and Clark. It is likely that Dye used Biddle's secondary source for the spelling, and her highly popular book made this version ubiquitous throughout the United States (previously most non-scholars had never even heard of Sacagawea).

Rozina George, great-great-great-great-granddaughter of Cameahwait, says the Agaidika tribe of Lemhi Shoshone do not recognize the spelling or pronunciation Sacagawea. Schools named in the interpreter's honor and other memorials erected in the area surrounding her birthplace use the spelling Sacajawea:

The Lemhi Shoshone call her Sacajawea. It is derived from the Shoshone word for her name, Saca tzah we yaa. In his Cash Book, William Clark spells Sacajawea with a "J". Also, William Clark and Private George Shannon explained to Nicholas Biddle (Published the first Lewis and Clark Journals in 1814) about the pronunciation of her name and how the tz sounds more like a "j". What better authority on the pronunciation of her name than Clark and Shannon who traveled with her and constantly heard the pronunciation of her name? We do not believe it is a Minnetaree (Hidatsa) word for her name. Sacajawea was a Lemhi Shoshone not a Hidatsa.

Idaho native John Rees explored the 'boat launcher' etymology in a long letter to the U.S. Commissioner of Indian Affairs written in the 1920s. It was republished in 1970 by the Lemhi County Historical Society as a pamphlet entitled "Madame Charbonneau" and contains many of the arguments in favor of the Shoshone derivation of the name.

The spelling Sacajawea, although widely taught until the late 20th century, is considered incorrect by modern academia. Linguistics professor Dr. Sven Liljeblad from the Idaho State University in Pocatello argues that "it is unlikely that Sacajawea is a Shoshoni word.… The term for 'boat' in Shoshoni is saiki, but the rest of the alleged compound would be incomprehensible to a native speaker of Shoshoni." The spelling with a “j” has subsided from general use, although the corresponding "soft j" pronunciation persists.

Sacagawea 
Sacagawea is the most widely used spelling of her name, usually pronounced with a hard "g" sound, occasionally with a soft "g" or "j" sound. Lewis and Clark's original journals mention Sacagawea by name seventeen times, spelled eight different ways, all with a "g". Clark used Sahkahgarwea, Sahcahgagwea, Sarcargahwea, and Sahcahgahweah, while Lewis used Sahcahgahwea, Sahcahgarweah, Sahcargarweah, and Sahcahgar Wea.

The spelling Sacagawea was established in 1910 by the Bureau of American Ethnology as the proper usage in government documents. It would be the spelling adopted by the U.S. Mint for use with the dollar coin, as well as the U.S. Board on Geographic Names and the National Park Service. The spelling is also used by numerous historical scholars.

Sakakawea 
Sakakawea is the next most widely-adopted spelling, and is the most-often accepted among specialists. Proponents say the name comes from the Hidatsa tsakáka wía ('bird woman'). Charbonneau told expedition members that his wife's name meant "Bird Woman," and in May 1805 Lewis used the Hidatsa meaning in his journal:

[A] handsome river of about fifty yards in width discharged itself into the shell river… [T]his stream we called Sah-ca-gah-we-ah or bird woman's River, after our interpreter the Snake woman.

Sakakawea is the official spelling of her name according to the Three Affiliated Tribes, which include the Hidatsa. This spelling is widely used throughout North Dakota (where she is considered a state heroine), notably in the naming of Lake Sakakawea, the extensive reservoir of Garrison Dam on the Missouri River.

The North Dakota State Historical Society quotes Russell Reid's 1986 book Sakakawea: The Bird Woman:

Her Hidatsa name, which Charbonneau stated meant "Bird Woman," should be spelled "Tsakakawias" according to the foremost Hidatsa language authority, Dr. Washington Matthews. When this name is anglicized for easy pronunciation, it becomes Sakakawea, "Sakaka" meaning "bird" and "wea" meaning "woman." This is the spelling adopted by North Dakota. The spelling authorized for the use of federal agencies by the United States Geographic Board is Sacagawea. Although not closely following Hidatsa spelling, the pronunciation is quite similar and the Geographic Board acknowledged the name to be a Hidatsa word meaning "Bird Woman.

Irving W. Anderson, president of the Lewis and Clark Trail Heritage Foundation, says:

 [T]he Sakakawea spelling similarly is not found in the Lewis and Clark journals. To the contrary, this spelling traces its origin neither through a personal connection with her nor in any primary literature of the expedition. It has been independently constructed from two Hidatsa Indian words found in the dictionary Ethnography and Philology of the Hidatsa Indians (1877), published by the Government Printing Office. Compiled by a United States Army surgeon, Dr. Washington Matthews, 65 years following Sacagawea's death, the words appear verbatim in the dictionary as "tsa-ka-ka, noun; a bird," and "mia [wia, bia], noun; a woman.

In popular culture 
Some fictional accounts speculate that Sacagawea was romantically involved with Lewis or Clark during their expedition. But, while the journals show that she was friendly with Clark and would often do favors for him, the idea of a romantic liaison was created by novelists who wrote much later about the expedition. This fiction was perpetuated in the Western film The Far Horizons (1955).

Film and television 
Several movies, both documentaries and fiction, have been made about, or featuring, Sacagawea:
 The Far Horizons (1955) – played by Donna Reed
 Lewis & Clark: Great Journey West (2002) – played by Alex Rice
 Jefferson's West (2003) – played by Cedar Henry
 The Simpsons, Season 15, Episode 11: Margical History Tour (2004) – played by Lisa Simpson
 Journey of Sacagawea (2004)
 Bill and Meriwether's Excellent Adventure (2006) – played by Crystal Lysne
 Night at the Museum (2006) – played by Mizuo Peck
 The Spirit of Sacajawea (2007)
 Night at the Museum 2: Battle of the Smithsonian (2009) – played by Mizuo Peck
 Night at the Museum: Secret of the Tomb (2014) – played by Mizuo Peck

Literature 
Two early twentieth-century novels shaped much of the public perception of Sacagawea. The Conquest: The True Story of Lewis and Clark (1902), was written by American suffragist Eva Emery Dye and published in anticipation of the expedition's centennial. The National American Woman Suffrage Association embraced her as a female hero, and numerous stories and essays about her were published  in ladies' journals. A few decades later, Grace Raymond Hebard published Sacajawea: Guide and Interpreter of Lewis and Clark (1933) to even greater success.

Sacagawea has since become a popular figure in historical and young adult novels. In her novel Sacajawea (1984), Anna Lee Waldo explored the story of Sacajawea's returning to Wyoming 50 years after her departure. The author was well aware of the historical research supporting an 1812 death, but she chose to explore the oral tradition.

Music and theatre
 In Philip Glass's "Piano Concerto No. 2 after Lewis & Clark", the second movement is entitled "Sacagawea".
 Sacagawea is mentioned in the Schoolhouse Rock song "Elbow Room" as the guide for Lewis and Clark.
 Sacagewea is referenced in Stevie Wonder's song "Black Man" from the album Songs in the Key of Life (1976).
 Tingstad & Rumbel's 1988 album Legends includes a piece entitled "Sacajawea".
Sacagawea is the name of a musical by Craig Bohmler and Mary Bracken Phillips. It was commissioned by the Willows Theatre Company in northern California and premiered at the annual John Muir Festival in the summer of 2008 at the Alhambra Performing Arts Center in Martinez.
 In 2010, Italian pianist and composer Alessandra Celletti released Sketches of Sacagawea, a limited-edition tribute box set with an album and accompanying book, on Al-Kemi Lab.

Other media 
The Dinner Party, an artwork installation by feminist artist Judy Chicago, features a place setting for Sacagawea in Wing Three, part of American Revolution to the Women's Revolution.

The first episode of the history podcast, The Broadsides, includes discussion of Sacagawea and her accomplishments during the Lewis and Clark Expedition.

Memorials and honors 

The Sacajawea Interpretive, Cultural, and Educational Center, located in Salmon, Idaho, by the rivers and mountains of Sacajawea's homeland. It contains a small museum and gift shop, in a  park. It is "owned and operated by the City of Salmon, in partnership with the Bureau of Land Management, Idaho Governor's Lewis & Clark Trail Committee, Salmon-Challis National Forest, Idaho Department of Fish & Game, and numerous non-profit and volunteer organizations."

Sacagawea was an important member of the Lewis and Clark Expedition. The National American Woman Suffrage Association of the early 20th century adopted her as a symbol of women's worth and independence, erecting several statues and plaques in her memory, and doing much to spread the story of her accomplishments.

In 1959, Sacagawea was inducted into the Hall of Great Westerners of the National Cowboy & Western Heritage Museum. In 1976, she was inducted into the National Cowgirl Museum and Hall of Fame in Fort Worth, Texas. In 2001, she was given the title of Honorary Sergeant, Regular Army, by President Bill Clinton. In 2003, she was inducted into the National Women's Hall of Fame.

The USS Sacagawea is one of several United States ships named in her honor.

Coinage 
In 2000, the United States Mint issued the Sacagawea dollar coin in her honor, depicting Sacagawea and her son, Jean Baptiste Charbonneau. Because no contemporary image of Sacagawea exists, the face on the coin was modeled on a modern Shoshone-Bannock woman, Randy'L He-dow Teton. The portrait design is unusual, as the copyrights have been assigned to and are owned by the U.S. Mint. The portrait is not in the public domain, as most US coin designs are.

Geography and parks 
 Lake Sakakawea in North Dakota
 Sacajawea Memorial Area, at Lemhi Pass, a National Historic Landmark managed by the National Forest Service and located on the boundary of Montana and Idaho, where visitors can hike the Lewis and Clark National Historic Trail. The Daughters of the American Revolution (DAR) created the memorial area in 1932 to honor Sacajawea for her role in the success of the Lewis and Clark Expedition.
 Mount Sacagawea, Fremont County, Wyoming, and the associated Sacagawea Glacier
 Sacagawea Heritage Trail, a bike trail in Tri-Cities, Washington
 Sacajawea Patera, a caldera on the planet Venus
 Sacajawea Peak
Wallowa County, Oregon
 Sacagawea Park, Gallatin County, Montana
Custer County, Idaho
 Sacagawea River in Montana
 Sacajawea State Park in Pasco, Washington

Sculpture 
 Astoria, Oregon — Sacagawea and Baby by Jim Demetro: a life-size bronze statue of Sacagawea and Jean-Baptiste, located at the Clatsop National Memorial, Netul Landing in Lewis and Clark National Historical Park, outside the visitor center.
 Bismarck, North Dakota — by Leonard Crunelle (1910): depicted with baby Pomp, located on the grounds of the North Dakota State Capitol. In 2003, the state gave a replica to the National Statuary Hall Collection in the U.S. Capitol Visitor Center.
 Boise, Idaho: installed in front of the Idaho History Museum in July 2003.
 Charlottesville, Virginia — monument was removed by the city on July 10, 2021; titled Their First View of the Pacific by Charles Keck (1919). It was a statue of Meriwether Lewis, William Clark, and Sacagawea. The Charlottesville City Council voted in November 2019 to remove the statue from its location, a decision "cheered by the local Native American tribe, the Monacan Indian Nation, and descendants of Sacagawea’s family in Idaho. They said the statue presented a weak and servile image of Sacagawea, who was rather an essential guide and interpreter for Lewis and Clark."
 Cheney, Washington — by Harold Balazs (1960): a statue of Sacagawea is displayed in the rose garden in front of the President's House at Eastern Washington University.
 Cody, Wyoming — by Harry Jackson (1980): painted bronze, 114 inches, the statue is located in the Greever Cashman Garden at the Buffalo Bill Historical Center
 Cody, Wyoming — by Richard V. Greeves (2005): Bronze, 72 inches, the sculpture is in the Robbie Powwow Garden at the Buffalo Bill Historical Center.
 Fort Benton, Montana — by Robert Scriver: a sculpture of Sacagawea and her baby, and Captains Lewis and Clark, in the riverside sculpture park.
 Fort Worth, Texas — by Glenna Goodacre (2001): Sacajawea statue outside the National Cowgirl Hall of Fame.
 Godfrey, Illinois — by Glenna Goodacre: at Lewis and Clark Community College; by the same artist who designed the image on the Sacagawea dollar
 Great Falls, Montana — "Explorers at the Portage", by Robert Scriver, contains a bronze 3/4 scale statue of Sacagawea, her baby Jean-Baptiste, Lewis, Clark, African American York, and the Newfoundland dog Seaman, at the Lewis and Clark National Historic Trail Interpretative Center. An earlier cersion of this piece, in Overlook Park in Great Falls, omits Sacajawea.
 Kansas City, Missouri — Corps of Discovery Monument by Eugene L. Daub (2000): includes life-size figures of Sacagawea and Jean-Baptiste, York, and Seaman on the bluff at Clark's Point overlook (Case Park, Quality Hill)
 Lander, Wyoming: in local cemetery, 14 miles West on U.S. 287, and then 2 miles West (after a turn); turnoff about three miles South of Fort Washakie; there is a tall statue of Sacagawea (6 ft) with tombstones downhill of her, husband, and two children; there also is a monument on site.
 Lewiston, Idaho: multiple statues, including one along the main approach to the city.
 Longview, Washington, a statue of Sacagawea and Jean-Baptiste was placed in Lake Sacajawea Park near the Hemlock St. footbridge in 2005.
 Mobridge, South Dakota — The Sacagawea Monument: an obelisk erected at the supposed site of her death, which honors Sacagawea as a member of the Shoshone tribe and for her contribution to the Corps of Discovery expedition; the associated marker "dates her death as December 20, 1812 and states that her body must be buried somewhere near the site of old Fort Manuel located 30 miles north of the marker."
 Portland, Oregon — by Alice Cooper (1905): Sacajawea and Jean-Baptiste was unveiled July 6, 1905 and moved to Washington Park, April 6, 1906.
 Portland, Oregon — by Glenna Goodacre: located at Lewis & Clark College, permanently installed on September 5, 2004/
 Richland, Washington — by Tom McClelland (2008)
 St. Louis, Missouri — by Harry Weber (2002): a statue of Sacagawea with her baby in a cradle board is included in the diorama of the Lewis & Clark expedition that is on display in the lobby of the St. Louis Drury Plaza Hotel, located in the historical International Fur Exchange building.
 Three Forks, Montana, in Sacajawea Park — Coming Home by Mary Michael: statue honoring Sacagawea, built in the area where she was abducted as a young girl and taken to Mandan lands.
 Wind River Indian Reservation, Wyoming: According to oral tradition, Sacagawea left her husband Toussaint Charbonneau and fled to Wyoming in the 1860s; her alleged burial site is located in the reservation's cemetery, with a gravestone inscription dating her death as April 9, 1884, however, oral tradition also indicates a woman named Porivo (recorded as "Bazil's mother") occupies that grave.

See also 

 Sacagawea's Nickname

Notes

References

External links 

 "Profile: Sacagawea", National Park Service
 Museum of Human Beings, a book by Colin Sargent
 Sacagawea – A Pioneer Interpreter at teck-translations.com
 Lewis and Clark Expedition Maps and Receipt. Yale Collection of Western Americana, Beinecke Rare Book and Manuscript Library.

 
1788 births
1812 deaths
19th-century Native Americans
American folklore
Captives of Native Americans
Cowgirl Hall of Fame inductees
Explorers of Oregon
Indigenous people of the Pacific Northwest
Lewis and Clark Expedition people
People from Lander, Wyoming
People from Lemhi County, Idaho
Northern Shoshone people
Slavery of Native Americans